Ezekiel 3 is the third chapter of the Book of Ezekiel in the Hebrew Bible or the Old Testament of the Christian Bible. This book contains the prophecies attributed to the prophet/priest Ezekiel, and is one of the Books of the Prophets. This chapter contains the call to Ezekiel to speak to the people of Israel and to act as a sentry for them.

Text
The original text was written in the Hebrew language. This chapter is divided into 27 verses.

Textual witnesses
Some early manuscripts containing the text of this chapter in Hebrew are of the Masoretic Text tradition, which includes the Codex Cairensis (895), the Petersburg Codex of the Prophets (916), Aleppo Codex (10th century), Codex Leningradensis (1008).

There is also a translation into Koine Greek known as the Septuagint, made in the last few centuries BC. Extant ancient manuscripts of the Septuagint version include Codex Vaticanus (B; B; 4th century), Codex Alexandrinus (A; A; 5th century) and Codex Marchalianus (Q; Q; 6th century).

The responsibility of the prophet (3:1–15)

Verse 1
He said to me, "Son of man, eat what you find; eat this scroll, and go, speak to the house of Israel".
"Son of man" is sometimes translated "O mortal", as in the New Revised Standard Version. Ezekiel is called 'son of man' here and throughout the remainder of the book, not as an honorific title, but as a mark of the distance between this 'mere mortal' and his divine interlocutor". Similarly, the prophet Jeremiah records that he "found" and "ate" the words of God.

Verse 3
 And He said to me,
 "Son of man, feed your belly, and fill your stomach with this scroll that I give you."
 So I ate,
 and it was in my mouth like honey in sweetness.
 "Like honey in sweetness": Although the scroll contains "lamentations and mourning and woe" (Ezekiel 2:10), when eaten it tastes "as sweet as honey" in the mouth. The phrase affirms the saying that 'God's word was sweet'.

Verse 15
 Then I came to the captives at Tel Abib, who dwelt by the River Chebar;
 and I sat where they sat, and remained there astonished among them seven days.
 "Tel Abib" (Tel Aviv; lit. "Spring Mound", where "Spring (Aviv) is the season") is an unidentified place on the Kebar Canal, near Nippur in what is now Iraq. The Kebar or Chebar river was part of a complex network of irrigation and transport canals that also included the Shatt el-Nil, a silted up canal toward the east of Babylon.
"Astonished" is read as "astonied" in the Revised Version, i.e. dumb and motionless. The seven-day long "period of motionless silence" seems to express "the strength of the prophet’s emotions" on his arrival at Tel Abib.

Ezekiel as a watchman for Israel (3:16–27)

Verse 16
And it came to pass at the end of seven days, that the word of the Lord came unto me, saying,
"At the end of seven days": During these days, Ezekiel had enough opportunity to be among the exiles, and was able to see the sphere and materials of his work, before his appointment to be a watchman.<ref name=benson>Benson, Joseph. [http://biblehub.com/commentaries/benson/ezekiel/3.htm '’Commentary on the Old and New Testaments. Ezekiel 3.] Accessed 9 Juli 2019.</ref> 

Verse 23
 So I arose and went out into the plain, and behold, the glory of the Lord stood there, like the glory which I saw by the River Chebar; and I fell on my face. "River Chebar": see notes on "Tel Abib" in verse 15.
"The plain": links this first vision of Ezekiel to the other vision in Ezekiel 37.

Verse 27
 But when I speak with you, I will open your mouth, and you shall say to them, "Thus says the Lord God." He who hears, let him hear; and he who refuses, let him refuse; for they are a rebellious house.''
The theme of dumbness and periodic restoration of speech emphasize that the word spoken by Ezekiel is from God, not the prophet's.

See also
Chebar River
Son of man
Related Bible parts: Ezekiel 1, Ezekiel 10, Ezekiel 43, Mark 4, Revelation 10

Notes

References

Sources

External links

Jewish
Ezekiel 3 Hebrew with Parallel English
Ezekiel 3 Hebrew with Rashi's Commentary

Christian
Ezekiel 3 English Translation with Parallel Latin Vulgate

03